Onay is a commune in the Haute-Saône department in the region of Bourgogne-Franche-Comté in eastern France.

Onay may also refer to:

 Onay (surname)
 Onay, Afghanistan
 Saint-Laurent-d'Onay, commune in the Drôme department in south-eastern France